Jacques Plumain (born August 14, 1973), known as The Ghost of Kehl (French: Fantôme de Kehl), is a French suspected serial killer who was convicted of killing two women in Germany and France from 1999 to 2001, but is considered a suspect in three others, being acquitted for one and never brought to trial for the other two.

In 2005, he was sentenced to life imprisonment with a 30-year security period, which was later reduced to 20 years on appeal. After serving out the minimum required sentence, he was paroled in January 2021.

Early life
Jacques Plumain was born on August 14, 1973, in Guadeloupe, an overseas department administered by France. The fourth of six children, all half-siblings fathered by different men, with Plumain's own father, a Jehovah's Witness, refusing to take part in raising him. A mediocre student during his youth, he was physically abused on a regular basis by his overbearing mother, whom he claimed beat him with a variety of applianaces such as her belt, telephone cord, an electric cable or a broomstick. Later on, Plumain would also claim that he was sexually assaulted by a cousin at age 13.

In 1989, the 16-year-old left Guadeloupe and moved to the French mainland, where he settled in Strasbourg in early 1990 and finished an apprenticeship for a cook. During that year, he started frequenting various nightclubs, where had numerous sexual liaisons with various women. In 1994, Plumain, a master corporal serving in the 1st Engineering Regiment of Illkirch, was stationed in Sarajevo and later Kosovo, where he disabled landmines. He was awarded a medal for his actions, but later quit to become a security guard. Plumain later claimed that he had seen a friend of his get shot through the eyes by an enemy sniper, but this story has not been substantiated. During his time working as a security guard, Plumain complained that he was mistreated due to his skin color, and the only time he truly felt at peace was when he playing sports. By the end of the 1990s, however, he gave up on sports and rejoined the army, but was later dishonorably discharged for stealing a credit card.

Murders

First suspected murders
In May 1999, the police in Plobsheim were notified of the murder of a 23-year-old prostitute, whose body was found in a garage. As he was a soldier stationed near the area at the time, Plumain was proposed as a suspect, but was not arrested due to a lack of evidence against him. Later that month, he completed his service and returned to Strasbourg, where he worked as a sprinter at the FC Sochaux-Montbéliard and later as a security guard.

On July 25, the body of 30-year-old Sylvia Hironimous was discovered in the backyard of a building in Strasbourg. At the time, nothing connected this murder to Plumain, who up until then had no criminal record and no concrete evidence indicated he was a viable suspect. However, three days later, he stabbed and seriously injured another young woman at the exit of a nightclub, for which he would be arrested. While he categorically denied responsibility, Plumain was nonetheless convicted and sentenced to a year in prison, but appealed the decision to the criminal court. He succeeded in obtaining due to lack of evidence connecting him to the crime, and he was released on October 7 of that year.

"Ghost of Kehl" murders
On October 11, 1999, at 4:00 AM, 22-year-old Turkish nurse Hatice Celik was attacked in the courtyard of a retirement home in Kehl, Germany, with her assailant knocking her down and dragging her away from prying eyes. Then, Celik was stabbed and had her throat cut, before the killer lowered her panties, without sexually assaulting her. While Plumain is considered the prime suspect in this case, he never admitted guilt to Celik's murder, and was never convicted in his following trials.

On November 23, at 4:00 AM, 38-year-old Barbel Zobel was attacked by Plumain just as she was leaving her house to go to work. He hit her from behind, but Zobel managed to call for help, at which point her husband intervened and caused the assailant to flee. As a result of these two recent cases, the Kehl police decided to conduct patrols to prevent further incidents.

On December 4, around 3:00 AM, Plumain was looking for a nightclub in Kehl, but got lost in the back roads. While wandering around, he stumbled upon 66-year-old Gisela Dallmann, a retiree who was distributing newspapers. He approached her from behind, but Dallmann was alerted to his presence, forcing him to press his hand against her mouth. After the woman bit him, the enraged Plumain hit her and dragged her off to an isolated corner, where he severed her carotid artery and pulled down her panties. He also inserted his finger into her vagina, in order to simulate a rape. Dallmann's body was found in the early morning in the backyard of a building. Following this third case, the Kehl police decided to monitor the city from top to bottom in order to catch the killer, who was given the nickname "The Ghost of Kehl". The investigation was unsuccessful, however, and Plumain soon returned to Strasbourg.

On May 15, 2000, around 9:00 PM, Plumain crossed paths with 44-year-old Ursula Brelowski, a German professor at the Robert Schuman University, in the La Wantzenau forest near Strasbourg, while she was riding a bicycle. Frustrated at the unavailability of any women to date, he punched her in the throat and dragged her off into the forest, where he stabbed Brelowski a dozen times in the torso, arms and legs before finally slitting her throat. The victim's body was found twenty hours later. At this stage of the investigation, the French police were contacted by the Kehl police several times without success, before they could make a connection between the cases in Germany.

Arrest
On January 19, 2001, Plumain was arrested for assaulting a motorist with a katana. He claimed that he had a "score to settle" with the driver, with whom he had had a violent argument a few months earlier. As a result, he was imprisoned for attempted murder, and by this time, he came under suspicion by investigators working on the "Ghost of Kehl" case.

On June 19, Plumain was interrogated about the crimes, and much to the investigators' surprise, he readily confessed to the crimes. In regards to the Brelowski murder, he said that he thought she was an acquaintance of his, but upon talking to her, Brelowski said that he was mistaken, with Plumain additionally claiming that she "didn't have negroes in her relationships." Upon hearing this, Plumain said he "saw red" and beat her into unconsciousness, before dragging her off into the woods and killing her there. As with previous victims, he lowered her panties to make it appear as if she had been raped. At the insistence of Brelowski's family, who were anxious to clear her daughter's name, Plumain later admitted that the victim never made any racist remarks, which he had fabricated. He additionally claimed that he never intended to kill Zobel, but he instinctively attacked her because she caught him stealing bicycle tires. On the other hand, he denied involvement in the murder of Hatice Celik. Soon after his confessions, he was indicted for the three murders and the attempted murder of Zobel. In June 2002, seventeen months after Plumain's initial internment, he was indicted for the murder of Sylvia Hironimus, which he also denied.

Trials and convictions
On September 24, 2003, Plumain's trial for the attempted murder of the motorist began in the cour d'assises of Strasbourg. He was found guilty, and sentenced to 12 years imprisonment. On May 18, 2005, his murder trial began at the same court, with Emmanuel Karm and Jean Guibert serving as his attorneys. On the prosecuting side, Gioia Zirone acted as Zobel's lawyer while Thomas Mutter was the lawyer for Marc Fisher, Ursula Brelowski's ex-partner. Brice Raymondeau-Castanet was the general counsel.

During the proceedings, Plumain appeared cold, detached and rarely spoke. In his statements, he claimed that a person named "Maïve" was the one who had killed all the women, and also claimed that a partial reason why he had attacked Zobel was because she resembled his mother. The Brelowski family's lawyers claimed that the victim would have never called him a "nigger", insisting that Plumain had killed Ursula solely out of impulse, not because of her alleged racist remarks. A psychiatric evaluation noted that Plumain was a pathological liar who liked to enjoyed the sight of degrading his victims. Near the end of the trial, Plumain, out of apparent remorse, confessed to the attack on Zobel and the murders of Dallmann and Brelowski, claiming that he was "not a victim" and pointing towards the benches where Zobel and Dallmann's son were seated.

On June 3, 2005, Plumain was convicted of on two counts of murder and the attempted murder, for which he was given a life term with a 30-year security sentence. As he was acquitted of Celik's murder, the prosecution demanded a new trial. On March 27, 2006, the appeal trial began in the cour d'assises
in Colmar, where he was again found guilty, but his security sentence was reduced to 20 years. In March 2008, the charges in the Hironimous murder was dismissed due to lack of evidence.

Plumain eventually served a total of 15 years of his sentence before being released from prison in January 2021. At trial proceedings, he claimed that he willingly attended psychiatric examinations in order to better understand why he had committed the murders and that he has embraced Catholicism, claiming that he was a reformed man. His release came from criticism from both the victims' families and his attorney, who stated in an interview that his former client could still pose a danger to those around him due to his behavior.

See also
 List of German serial killers

TV documentaries
 "Jacques Plumain, the Ghost of Kehl" (September 2008; January 2010) on Faites entrer l'accusé, presented by Christophe Hondelatte on France 2.
 "The border killer (first report)...in Alsace-Lorraine" (September 21, September 28 and October 6, 2015) on Crimes on NRJ 12.

External links
 INA archive, television news broadcast from France 2, September 24, 2003, duration: 1 minute and 14 seconds
 INA archive, newscast of France 3 of May 18, 2005, duration: 2 minutes and 10 seconds

References

1973 births
20th-century French criminals
21st-century French criminals
French male criminals
French military personnel
French people convicted of murder
French people of Guadeloupean descent
French prisoners sentenced to life imprisonment
Guadeloupean people
Living people
People acquitted of murder
People convicted of assault
People convicted of attempted murder
People convicted of murder by France
Prisoners sentenced to life imprisonment by France
Suspected serial killers
Violence against women in France
Violence against women in Germany